The Kautz graph  is a 
directed graph of degree  and dimension , which has  vertices labeled by all
possible strings  of length  which are composed of characters  chosen from
an alphabet  containing  distinct
symbols, subject to the condition that adjacent characters in the
string cannot be equal.

The Kautz graph   has  edges

It is natural to label each such edge of  
between edges of the Kautz graph  
and vertices of the Kautz graph
.

Kautz graphs are closely related to De Bruijn graphs.

Properties 
 For a fixed degree  and number of vertices , the Kautz graph has the smallest diameter of any possible directed graph with  vertices and degree .
  All Kautz graphs have Eulerian cycles. (An Eulerian cycle is one which visits each edge exactly once—This result follows because Kautz graphs have in-degree equal to out-degree for each node)
 A degree- Kautz graph has  disjoint paths from any node  to any other node .

In computing 
The Kautz graph has been used as a network topology for connecting processors in high-performance computing and fault-tolerant computing applications: such a network is known as a Kautz network.

Notes 

Parametric families of graphs
Directed graphs